Mike Koenders (born 9 May 1992) is a German professional footballer who plays as a defender for Oberliga Niederrhein club Ratingen 04/19. He formerly played for FC Emmen.

External links
 Voetbal International

1992 births
People from Nordhorn
Footballers from Lower Saxony
Living people
German footballers
Association football defenders
FC Emmen players
PEC Zwolle players
SC Genemuiden players
BV Cloppenburg players
VfB Homberg players
Eerste Divisie players
Regionalliga players
Oberliga (football) players
German expatriate footballers
Expatriate footballers in the Netherlands
German expatriate sportspeople in the Netherlands